The Difficult Way is a 1914 British silent drama film directed by George Loane Tucker and starring Jane Gail, Gerald Ames and Langhorn Burton.

Cast
 Jane Gail as Nan 
 Gerald Ames as Roger Wentworth 
 Langhorn Burton as Rev. John Pilgrim

References

Bibliography
 Brian McFarlane & Anthony Slide. The Encyclopedia of British Film: Fourth Edition. Oxford University Press, 2013.

External links
 

1914 films
1914 drama films
British silent feature films
British drama films
Films directed by George Loane Tucker
British black-and-white films
1910s English-language films
1910s British films
Silent drama films